Pope Gabriel VII of Alexandria (Anda Gabriel VII) was the 95th Coptic Orthodox Pope of Alexandria and Patriarch of the See of St. Mark.

He was born in the area around the monastery of El-Mouharraq, and at a young age he became a monk in the wilderness at the Monastery of Saint Macarius the Great.  Known for his good conduct and great holiness, he was ordained Patriarch in 1525 A.D. following the death of Pope John XIII.  Gabriel's patriarchate witnessed the early years of Ottoman rule in Egypt.

Gabriel was patriarch for more than forty years. Some of his important accomplishments were the renovation of the monasteries of Saint Anthony, and Saint Paul, the first hermit, in the Eastern desert, and the monastery of El-Mouharraq in Upper Egypt.

Some people in authority asked him to approve things against the welfare of his flock.  The Pope chose to leave his Chair and he went to the Monastery of Saint Anthony, for he desired to keep what the Lord said: "Greater love has no man than this, that a man lay down his life for his friends." (John 15:13) The Lord examined him but he endured thankfully, and received the blessing that the Lord gave for those persecuted for the sake of righteousness.  Pope Gabriel died in 1570 following a brief illness.

References 

General

Atiya, Aziz S. The Coptic Encyclopedia. New York: Macmillan Publishing Co., 1991.

External links 
 The Official website of the Coptic Orthodox Pope of Alexandria and Patriarch of All Africa on the Holy See of Saint Mark the Apostle
 Coptic Documents in French

16th-century Coptic Orthodox popes of Alexandria
1570 deaths